The Alphabet Murders is a 1965 British detective film directed by Frank Tashlin and starring Tony Randall as Hercule Poirot. It is based on the 1936 novel The A.B.C. Murders by Agatha Christie.

Plot
Albert Aachen, a clown with a unique diving act, is found dead, the murder weapon happens to be a poison dart. When a woman named Betty Barnard becomes the next victim, detective Hercule Poirot suspects that Sir Carmichael Clarke could be in grave danger.

As Poirot and Captain Hastings look into the crimes, a beautiful woman with an interesting monogram named Amanda Beatrice Cross becomes the focus of their investigation, at least until she leaps into the Thames.

Cast
 Tony Randall as Hercule Poirot
 Anita Ekberg as Amanda
 Robert Morley as Captain Hastings
 Maurice Denham as Inspector Japp
 Guy Rolfe as Duncan Doncaster
 Sheila Allen as Lady Diane
 James Villiers as Franklin
 Julian Glover as Don Fortune
 Grazina Frame as Betty Barnard
 Clive Morton as 'X'
 Cyril Luckham as Sir Carmichael Clarke
 Richard Wattis as Wolf
 David Lodge as Sergeant
 Patrick Newell as Cracknell
 Austin Trevor as Judson
 Windsor Davies as Dragbot
 Drewe Henley as Bowling Alley Attendant
 Sheila Reid as Mrs. Fortune
 Margaret Rutherford as Miss Marple
 Stringer Davis as Mr. Stringer.

Production background
The part of Poirot had originally been intended for Zero Mostel but the film was delayed because Agatha Christie objected to the script; amongst the things objected to was the intention to put in a bedroom scene with Hercule Poirot. The film varies significantly from the novel and emphasises comedy, the specialty of director Frank Tashlin. Poirot is given buffoonish characteristics, while still remaining a brilliant detective.

The film features an uncredited cameo by Margaret Rutherford as Miss Marple and Stringer Davis as her friend Mr Stringer. The pair had previously appeared in a series of four films as the characters produced by MGM between 1961 and 1964.

Austin Trevor as the butler Judson had played Poirot in three British films in the early 1930s: Alibi (1931), Black Coffee (1931) and Lord Edgware Dies (1934).

Reception
Leonard Maltin gives the film 2 1/2 out of 4 stars, calling it an "odd adaptation" of Christie's book. Maltin goes on to say, "the strange casting of Randall ... and a little too much slapstick make this more a curiosity than anything else." TCM calls Randall's Poirot "an Inspector Clouseau-style bumbler", noting that the second installment of the Pink Panther series had been well-received the previous year. A. H. Weiler of The New York Times dismissed the film as "a routine run through of clichés and clues."

See also
 Agatha Christie's Great Detectives Poirot and Marple, another case of Marple and Poirot coexisting in the same story

References

External links
 

1965 films
1960s mystery films
British detective films
Films based on Hercule Poirot books
Films directed by Frank Tashlin
Metro-Goldwyn-Mayer films
Films scored by Ron Goodwin
Films shot at MGM-British Studios
1960s English-language films
1960s British films